Malot may refer to:

People
 Hector Malot (1830–1907), French writer
 Leah Malot (born 1972), Kenyan runner

Places
 Malot, Islamabad, Pakistan
 Malot Fort, Pakistan